Eugène Renevier (26 March 18314 May 1906) Swiss geologist, was born at Lausanne, Switzerland, as a descendant of a noble family.

After about three years of study at the polytechnical school of Stuttgart, Renevier in 1851 went to Geneva to study under F. J. Pictet. In 1854 he went to Paris to attend the lectures of Hébert and to study fossil nummulites found in the limestone of the Alps.

From 1859 to 1881 he was an associate professor of geology and mineralogy, then a full professor of geology and paleontology at the Academy in Lausanne (1881–1906). In 1890 the academy attained the name and status of a university. In 1898–90 he was rector of the University of Lausanne. For many years, he also served as curator of the cantonal museum of geology (1874–1906).

He is distinguished for his researches on the geology and paleontology of the Alps, on which subjects he published numerous papers in the proceedings of the scientific societies in Switzerland and France. With F. J. Pictet he wrote a memoir on the Fossiles du terrain aptien de la Perte-du-Rhone (1854). In 1894 he was appointed president of the Swiss Geological Commission, and also of the International Geological Congress held that year at Zurich, in the previous meetings of which he had taken a prominent part. He published a noteworthy Tableau des terrains sédimentaires (1874); and a second more elaborate edition, accompanied by an explanatory article Chronographe géologique, was issued in 1897 as a supplement to the Report of the Zurich Congress. This new table was printed on colored sheets, the colors for each geological system corresponding with those adopted on the International geological map of Europe.

In 1879, he was elected as a member to the American Philosophical Society.

References

1831 births
1906 deaths
19th-century Swiss geologists
Swiss paleontologists
Academic staff of the University of Lausanne